Zysovich Architecture is a Miami, Florida based architecture firm that also does substantial business in Colombia (it has an office in Bogota). The firm designed the domestic and international terminals at Bogota's El Dorado International Airport. The firm is also designing schools in Colombia. Bernard Zysovich is the firm's president.

References

Architecture firms based in Florida